Stefan Umjenovic (born 11 August 1995) is an Austrian professional footballer who plays for SV Lafnitz.

Career

Club career
On 12 August 2019, Umjenovic joined Finnish club Kokkolan Palloveikot on a contract for the rest of the year. He then returned to Floridsdorfer AC in January 2020, before joining SV Lafnitz on 4 August 2020.

References

External links
 

1995 births
Living people
Austrian footballers
Austrian expatriate footballers
Austrian people of Serbian descent
Association football midfielders
FC Lustenau players
SC Rheindorf Altach players
Floridsdorfer AC players
Kokkolan Palloveikot players
SV Lafnitz players
2. Liga (Austria) players
Austrian Football Bundesliga players
Austrian Regionalliga players
Veikkausliiga players
Austrian expatriate sportspeople in Finland
Expatriate footballers in Finland